383 Commando Petroleum Troop is a reserve platoon of the British Army's Royal Logistic Corps.

Operations
The troop is responsible for the handling, supply and storage of bulk fuels from ship-to-shore and under front-line combat conditions. It is a Commando unit and its soldiers must pass the All Arms Commando Course in order to serve with the Regulars in the Commando Logistic Regiment in 3 Commando Brigade, Royal Marines.

References

External links 
Official site

Commandos (United Kingdom)
Royal Logistic Corps